Karam Natour (born 1992 in Nazareth, Israel) is a visual artist. Natour’s practice employs a variety of mediums, including video, digital drawing, and installation, although he considers video his ‘mother tongue’

Biography 
Karam Natour was born in Nazareth, Israel in 1992, and was raised in Shefa-'Amr, Israel. He studied in Bezalel Academy of Art and Design, receiving BFA in 2015 and MFA in 2017. Natour started to teach in Bezalel Academy of Art and Design from 2018.

His works have been exhibited in various museums and venues including Tel Aviv Museum of Art (Israel), Israel Museum (Israel), Kunstmuseum Bochum (Germany), Triumph Gallery (Moscow), Haifa Museum of Art (Israel), and solo shows at Sommer Contemporary Art (Zurich), CCA Tel Aviv-Yafo (Israel), Umm al-Fahm Art Gallery (Israel), Rosenfeld Gallery (Israel), and Hulu Split Gallery (Croatia). 

Natour has received various awards including the 2020 Wolf Foundation’s Kiefer Prize for Young Artists and the 2019 Young Artist Award from the Ministry of Science, Culture and Sport. In 2020 Natour was chosen for Forbes 30 Under 30 list.

In 2022 he moved to live and work in Milan, Italy.

Work 
The main protagonist in Natour’s video works and drawings is his own figure, which he takes on historic, cultural, and social journeys. Natour’s drawings are digital illustrations that usually start from a still photo or video on which he traces the image with a digital pen. In his drawing practice, Natour is led by different “others” —or as the artist calls them “entities”— which function as spiritual muses. Natour sees these “entities” as co-creators. The body’s corporal presence is a recurring motif in Natour’s works, which highlights the allegorical associations involving the existence of the body. In his different drawings, Natour often touches on the figure of the artist with a tongue in cheek approach, humor, and cynicism.

In his works, there is an internal conflict with and in relation to art, jokes that build on traditional artistic iconography, and a dialogue with other artworks which lies between ironic ridicule to homage that mediates the language, politics, and even art in a new manner. Natour exposes the distortion and powerlessness found in structured systems of information imposed by the hegemonic mechanisms.

Nothing Personal 
Natour's Nothing Personal (2017) is a 20-minutes video art piece. It is considered one of Natour's most controversial artworks. In the video, Natour plays the role of an immobilised artist and is seen lying on a bed in his studio. He calls the emergency services and ask the paramedics to come and rescue him. “I cannot move, and I am so scared,” speaking to the operator in English, not Hebrew nor Arabic. Both the operator and himself speak broken English to each other, neither being completely comfortable, thus levelling the field and neutralising the power of the majoritarian which is also manifested through mastery of language. Recorded in real time, the video shows the paramedics arriving about a few minutes later, bringing two teams, not only one, and demonstrating extreme care for the mysterious case of the immobilised artist. “There is something in me that I can’t get out myself,” whines Natour. The video shows two channels that present two simultaneous views: one turning into the artist’s studio, and the other looking out from the studio to the corridor and entrance hall leading into it.

Swerving between reality and fiction, metaphor and plain speech, Natour explores the condition of the artist who, in fact, needs the help of outside forces to complete his project. After a few minutes, one of the paramedics notices the camera filming the crew and mentions it in Hebrew, but the others don’t seem troubled by this fact. Soon after this, Natour starts to feel better, he is able to move and breathe normally. “It is typical of stress,” claims one of the paramedics. Before leaving, someone takes Natour’s ID number and health insurance information, then wishes him a quick recovery. Natour made the video a week before a solo exhibition when he was under extreme stress, not knowing exactly what to produce. 

There are many layers of meaning to unravel in this work, starting with the limited freedom of movement of the artist who depends on various benevolent outside forces, from audience to participants, and from exhibiting institutions to funders. But of course there is also the topic of the tension between minority and majority tempered by the usage of English by both parties, and maybe even of ethics: what is OK to do in the name of art? Natour opened himself up to risk, assuming the potential consequences of his action, maybe even putting a sick person’s life in jeopardy if another ambulance could not reach them, but also of course of being discovered by the paramedics for staging the situation. For Natour, language is inherent in power relations, it is a tool of control but also a means of connection and often, misunderstanding. Therefore its function is always thematised in his work.

The video has caused controversy when it was presented at the Tel Aviv Museum of Art in 2017. In a newspaper review on the work wrote the art critic Dr. Shaul Setter: 

Natour is an artist who undertakes sometimes poetic, sometimes blatant analyses of identity, citizenship, intimacy, and power relations by playing with language, and performing actions that rely on repetition, humor, and mutual trust. He doesn’t make any absolute political statements, yet by using himself and his family in his videos, he becomes the incarnation of the political body through which we can grasp the existential conflicts that he, and other minorities, carry.

Exhibitions

Solo 
 2021	“Karam Natour: Vidéos”, Montpellier Danse, Montpellier, France
 2021	“Night Vision”, CCA Tel Aviv-Yafo, Tel Aviv, Israel
 2021	“Blessing in Disguise”, Sommer Contemporary Art, Zurich, Switzerland
 2021	“Family Pictures”, duo show with Guy Ben-Ner, Oranim College Gallery, Tivon, Israel
 2020	“Blurred Lines”, HULU SPLIT, Split, Coratia
 2018	“Body Following Spirit”, Rosenfeld Gallery, Tel Aviv, Israel
2018	“Repeat After Me”, Umm al-Fahm Art Gallery, Umm El Fahem, Israel
2016	“Following No Mythologies”, Rosenfeld Gallery, Tel Aviv, Israel

Selected group 
2021  	“Global Positioning”, Public Art Fund, New York, USA
2021  	“Someone Else”, Museum für Neue Kunst Freiburg, Freiburg, Germany
2021  	“Speech Act”, Fosdick-Nelson Gallery, Alfred University, New York, USA
2021  	“That Those Beings Be Not Being”, W139 Gallery, Amsterdam, Netherlands
2021  	“Glocal Emotions”, Motorenhalle Gallery, Dresden, Germany
2021  	“The Way We Survive”, Petah Tikva Museum of Art, Petah Tikva, Israel
2021  	“Love in the Time of Social Media”, Rote Fabrik, Zurich, Switzerland
2020  “Bodyscapes”, The Israel Museum, Jerusalem, Israel
2019  “Family Stories”, Kunstmuseum Bochum, Bochum, Germany
2019  “Drop Dead Funny”, The Brno House of Arts, Brno, Czech Republic
2018  “Illuminations“,Triumph Gallery, Moscow, Russia
2018  “Looper“, Tel Aviv Museum of Art, Tel Aviv, Israel
2018  “Seven Rituals to Change the Mood“, Hamidrasha Gallery, Tel Aviv, Israel
2018  “70/70/70“, the Santa Barbara Center for Art, California, USA
2018  “I to Eye, The Israel Museum, Jerusalem, Israel
2018  “Shop it!“, Haifa Museum of Art, Haifa, Israel
2018  “Mixed Chromosome“, MOM ART SPACE, Hamburg, Germany
2018  “ShowReal, the Photography Gallery of Bezalel Academy, Jerusalem, Israel
2018  “Hide and Seek, The Israel Museum, Jerusalem, Israel
 2017  “Aiming for Touch“, P8 Gallery, Tel Aviv, Israel
2017  “VOID, Veinti4/Siete Galería, San José, USA
2017  “Current Affairs“, Tel Aviv Museum of Art, Tel Aviv, Israel
2017  “Yerucham“, ZUMU Museum, Yerucham, Israel
2017  “Masterpiss“, Janco Dada Museum, Ein Hod, Israel
2017  “The Kids are All Right, Oranim College, Kiryat Tivon, Israel
 2015  “Memorial to the Goyim, Hanina Gallery, Tel Aviv, Israel
 2015  “Desert-Things”, Barbur Gallery. Jerusalem, Israel
2015  “Correspondences“, Gershman Hall Gallery, Philadelphia, USA

Awards 
 2020	Art Kiefer Prize Laureate 
2020	Young Video Artist Award, Ministry of Science Culture and Sport, Jerusalem
2018	Special Mention of the Jury Award, Bucharest International Experimental Film Festival
2017	Academic Excellence Award, MFA program, Bezalel Academy of Art and Design
2015	10X10 Prize for Academic Excellence, Bezalel Academy of Art and Design
2012	Revital Serri Z.L. Award, Excellence Prize, Bezalel Academy of Art and Design

References

External links 
Karam Natour
Karam Natour on Haaretz

Israeli Arab artists
Bezalel Academy of Arts and Design alumni
Academic staff of Bezalel Academy of Arts and Design
1992 births
Living people
Israeli video artists
Israeli contemporary artists